Ian Johnson may refer to:

 Ian Johnson (cricketer) (1917–1998), Australian Test cricket captain
 Ian Johnson (businessman) (1949–2019), managing director of the Seven Network
 Ian Johnson (writer) (born 1962), Beijing-based writer and journalist
 Ian Johnson (footballer, born 1975), English professional footballer
 Ian Johnson (footballer, born 1983), English football midfielder
 Ian Johnson (American football) (born 1986), running back
 Ian Johnson, a character in the 2013 Utopia (UK TV series)
 Ian Johnson (publicist), public relations manager based in London
 Ian Johnson, British economist in GLOBE
 Ian Johnson (water polo) (1925–2001), British Olympic water polo player

See also
Ian Johnston (disambiguation)